Hyderabad Street Circuit is a  street circuit laid out on the city streets of Hyderabad, Telangana, India. The track will be set up in and around the Secretariat Complex and will go through Lumbini Park, situated on the banks of Hussain Sagar Lake. The Hyderabad ePrix is staged on the circuit in 2023. It was first held as part of the 2022–23 Formula E World Championship season and was the first Formula E race to be held in the country.

History
Hyderabad was one of a number of Indian cities bidding to host a round of the FIA Formula E World Championship, although it was only seriously considered after the COVID-19 pandemic had halted the discussions between the FIA and proposed hosts in Delhi and Mumbai.  On 17 January 2022 the Government of Telangana signed a "letter of intent" with Formula E to stage the Hyderabad E-Prix, with a planned debut as a round of the 2022/23 season, towards the start of the season. The Hyderabad E-Prix was subsequently listed on the first provisional calendar for 2022–23 as the fourth round of the season, with an initial date of 11 February 2023.

Besides Formula E, it was also planned for Hyderabad Street Circuit to host races for the Formula Regional Indian Championship and the F4 Indian Championship, however both championships were cancelled in 2022. After the cancellation of those championships, the circuit will host only the Indian Racing League event in 2022.

Circuit
The racetrack's starting position is across from the NTR Garden, from where it would pass via NTR Marg and IMAX road before returning to the starting point in a loop. For the competing teams, a total of 12 FIA pit garages are being constructed close to the IMAX turning.
Two designs of the circuit exist: one by PPE Racing (Design A) and the other by Driven International (Design B). Drivers criticised Design A due to its somewhat phallic shape, with Norman Nato even saying that "[the track] looks like a dildo". Design A was later scrapped and replaced by Design B. Driven International, the creators of Design B, notably redesigned the Yas Marina Circuit in Abu Dhabi in 2021.

Design B changed numerous aspects of the track, such as making the Turn One hairpin less tight, and adding a chicane between Turn Six and Turn Seven. Design B also moved the pit lane to before the newly added chicane.

Lap records 

The fastest official race lap records at the Hyderabad Street Circuit are listed as:

See also
 Buddh International Circuit
 Madras Motor Race Track

References

External links 
Hyderabad Street Circuit | India | Driven International
Hyderabad Street Circuit

Hyderabad
Hyderabad
Hyderabad